Anthony Cowan Jr. (born October 7, 1997) is an American basketball player for Promitheas Patras of the Greek Basket League and the EuroCup. He played college basketball for the Maryland Terrapins.

High school career
Cowan is the son of Anthony Cowan Sr. and began playing basketball at the age of seven. He attended St. John's College High School. As a senior, Cowan led St. John's to beat DeMatha Catholic High School for the Washington Catholic Athletic Conference title. He played on the D.C. Assault Amateur Athletic Union team alongside future college teammate Melo Trimble. A four-star recruit rated the No. 62 prospect in his class by Scout.com, Cowan committed to Maryland.

College career
Cowan averaged 10.3 points and 3.7 assists per game as a freshman. As a sophomore, Cowan averaged 15.8 points, 5.1 assists and 4.4 rebounds per game. Cowan was named to the third-team All-Big Ten and the conference defensive team. As a junior, Cowan led the team with 15.6 points and 4.4 assists per game. He was named to the second-team All-Big Ten. He scored a season-high 27 points in a January 8, 2019 victory against Minnesota. After the season he declared for the 2019 NBA draft but ultimately withdrew and returned for his senior season.

Cowan scored a then career-high 30 points in a 76–69 victory over Temple on November 28, 2019. On December 7, Cowan made a game-tying 3-pointer in the final 20 seconds and a free throw with 2.1 seconds left to give Maryland the lead in a 59–58 victory over Illinois, finishing with 20 points, seven rebounds and six assists. Cowan set a new career high on January 31, 2020, scoring 31 points and collecting six rebounds in a 82–72 win over Iowa. At the close of the regular season, Cowan was named to the First Team All-Big Ten by the coaches and Second Team by the media. Cowan averaged 16.3 points, 4.7 assists, and 3.6 rebounds per game as a senior.

Professional career 
Cowan went undrafted in the 2020 NBA draft, but was selected by the Memphis Hustle with the 16th overall pick in the 2021 NBA G League draft. He averaged 6.2 points and 2.2 assists per game with the Hustle. 

On September 17, 2021, Cowan signed with Aris of the Greek Basket League. In 26 games, he averaged 14.5 points, 2.8 rebounds, 5.6 assists and 1.4 steals, playing around 33 minutes per contest.

On July 19, 2022, Cowan signed a two-year deal with Promitheas Patras of the Greek Basket League and the EuroCup.

Career statistics

College

|-
| style="text-align:left;"| 2016–17
| style="text-align:left;"| Maryland
| 33 || 33 || 29.0 || .424 || .321 || .769 || 3.9 || 3.7 || 1.2 || .2 || 10.3
|-
| style="text-align:left;"| 2017–18
| style="text-align:left;"| Maryland
| 32 || 32 || 37.0 || .422 || .367 || .848 || 4.4 || 5.1 || 1.5 || .3 || 15.8
|-
| style="text-align:left;"| 2018–19
| style="text-align:left;"| Maryland
| 34 || 34 || 34.6 || .393 || .337 || .806 || 3.7 || 4.4 || .9 || .2 || 15.6
|-
| style="text-align:left;"| 2019–20
| style="text-align:left;"| Maryland
| 31 || 31 || 34.7 || .390 || .322 || .811 || 3.6 || 4.7 || 1.0 || .2 || 16.3
|- class="sortbottom"
| style="text-align:center;" colspan="2"| Career
| 130 || 130 || 33.8 || .405 || .338 || .811 || 3.9 || 4.5 || 1.1 || .2 || 14.5

NBA G League

|-
| style="text-align:left;"| 2020–21
| style="text-align:left;"| Memphis
| 15 || 33 || 15.1 || .457 || .412 || .667 || 1.3 || 2.2 || 0.9 || .1 || 6.3
|- class="sortbottom"
| style="text-align:center;" colspan="2"| Career
| 15 || 33 || 15.1 || .457 || .412 || .667 || 1.3 || 2.2 || 0.9 || .1 || 6.3

References

External links
 Maryland Terrapins bio

1997 births
Living people
American expatriate basketball people in Greece
American men's basketball players
Aris B.C. players
Basketball players from Maryland
Maryland Terrapins men's basketball players
Memphis Hustle players
People from Bowie, Maryland
Point guards
Promitheas Patras B.C. players